Poynor Township is an inactive township in Ripley County, in the U.S. state of Missouri.

Poynor Township was erected in 1920, and named after the community of Poynor, Missouri.

References

Townships in Missouri
Townships in Ripley County, Missouri